"Candy" is a song from Paolo Nutini which was released on 18 May 2009. The song is the lead single from his second studio album Sunny Side Up.

Release and reception
The single made the A-list on BBC Radio 1 and BBC Radio 2, as well as the B-list on Absolute Radio. It charted at number 19 on the UK Singles Chart, making it his third highest-charting single behind "Last Request" (number five) and "Pencil Full Of Lead" (number 17). In Scotland, "Candy" is Nutini's highest-charting single alongside "Last Request", topping the Scottish Singles Chart. Elsewhere, the song reached number 10 in Switzerland and the top 30 in Ireland and Italy.

Charts

Weekly charts

Year-end charts

Certifications

Covers
In 2010, the song was covered by Welsh act Marina and the Diamonds on Dermot O'Leary's show on BBC Radio 2.
In 2014, Kungs & Jasmine Thompson are collaborating to make a cover version of the song which uses the elements of Tropical house and Deep house. Previously, Thompson released a cover version of the song back in February.

References

2009 singles
2009 songs
Atlantic Records UK singles
Number-one singles in Scotland
Paolo Nutini songs
Songs written by Paolo Nutini